Midhat Gluhačević (2 June 1965 — 14 March 2005) was a Bosnian professional footballer who played as a forward.

Career
Gluhačević started his career with FK Sarajevo in 1987, before transferring to NK Osijek. With the start of the Yugoslav wars he moved to Germany where he played professionally until 2003.

Death
He died after a long illness in 2005 at the age of 40.

References 

1965 births
2005 deaths
Bosniaks of Bosnia and Herzegovina
Association football forwards
Yugoslav footballers
Bosnia and Herzegovina footballers
FK Sarajevo players
NK Osijek players
SC Freiburg players
FC Stahl Brandenburg players
1. FC Schweinfurt 05 players
SSV Jahn Regensburg players
Yugoslav First League players
2. Bundesliga players
Regionalliga players
Oberliga (football) players
Yugoslav expatriate footballers
Bosnia and Herzegovina expatriate footballers
Yugoslav expatriate sportspeople in Germany
Bosnia and Herzegovina expatriate sportspeople in Germany
Expatriate footballers in Germany